Free machining steel is steel that forms small chips when machined. This increases the machinability of the material by breaking the chips into small pieces, thus avoiding entanglement in the machinery. This enables automatic equipment to run without human interaction. Free machining steel with lead also allow for higher machining rates. Free machining steel costs 15 to 20% more than standard steel, but this higher cost is offset by increased machining speeds, larger cuts, and longer tool life.

The disadvantages of free machining steel are: ductility is decreased; impact resistance is reduced; copper-based brazed joints suffer from embrittlement with bismuth free machining grades; shrink fits are not as strong.

Types
There are four main types of free machining steel: leaded, resulfurized, rephosphorized and super. Super free-machining steels are alloyed with tellurium, selenium, and bismuth.

Mechanics
Free machining steels are carbon steels that have sulfur, lead, bismuth, selenium, tellurium, or phosphorus added. Sulfur forms the compound manganese sulfide, which is soft and acts as a chip-breaking discontinuity. It also acts as a dry lubricant to prevent a built up edge on the cutting tool. Lead works in a similar way to sulfur. Bismuth achieves a free machining steel by melting into a thin film of liquid for a fraction of a microsecond to lubricate the cut. Other advantages to bismuth include: more uniformly distributed because of its similar density to iron; more environmentally friendly, as compared to lead; still weldable.

References

Bibliography
.

Steels